Pasta alla gricia is a pasta dish originating from Lazio. It consists of pasta, Pecorino romano, black pepper and Guanciale.

Origin of the name
According to the most likely hypothesis, the name of the dish derives from the romanesco word gricio. In papal Rome, the grici were sellers of common edible foods, and got this name because many of them came from Valtellina, at that time possession of the Swiss canton of Grigioni. Pasta alla gricia then would mean pasta prepared with the simple ingredients (guanciale, pecorino romano, black pepper) readily available at the local gricio. 

Another theory about the origin of this dish claims that it was invented in the hamlet Grisciano, in the region of Lazio, near Amatrice. This theory is unlikely, however, both for the size of Grisciano, which is little more than a group of houses, and because in this case the adverbial locution should be alla grisciana. It should be noticed that in Amatrice as late as the 1960s, amatriciana sauce was prepared without tomato, therefore coinciding with gricia. Due to this reason, gricia is often named amatriciana bianca.

See also 
 Carbonara
 Cacio e pepe

Notes

Sources

Pasta dishes
Cuisine of Lazio